The 24th Annual Gotham Independent Film Awards, presented by the Independent Filmmaker Project, were held on December 1, 2014. The nominees were announced on October 23, 2014. The ceremony was hosted by Uma Thurman.

Winners and nominees

Special awards

Special Jury Award – Ensemble Performance
 Foxcatcher – Steve Carell, Mark Ruffalo, and Channing TatumSpotlight on Women Filmmakers "Live the Dream" Grant
 Chloé Zhao – Songs My Brothers Taught Me
 Garrett Bradley – Below Dreams
 Claire Carré – Embers

Gotham Tributes
 Tilda Swinton
 Bennett Miller
 Ted Sarandos

References

External links
 

2014 film awards
2014